The Shade, The Slave or The Titan is a sculpture by the French artist Auguste Rodin.

Evolution
The sculpture was conceived around 1880 and used in triplicate as a part of the artist's large-scale work The Gates of Hell. It evolved into both the full size sculpture The Three Shades, and a separate sculpture of a single figure, The Shade.

The original individual figure had no right hand - Rodin had Josef Maratka add one in 1904 for both the individual figure and The Three Shades.

See also
List of sculptures by Auguste Rodin

References

External links

Sculptures of the Museo Soumaya
Sculptures by Auguste Rodin
1880 sculptures
Plaster sculptures
Bronze sculptures in Mexico
Statues in Mexico City